The Nio 333 Racing is a motor racing team currently competing in the FIA Formula E Championship, an all-electric racing series. The team is owned and managed by Lisheng Sports and Gusto Engineering in China and Hong Kong, respectively.

The team, previously competing under the names China Racing, NEXTEV TCR, NEXTEV Nio, Nio Formula E Team, and Nio 333 Racing, has participated in the FIA Formula E World Championship ever since its inaugural season (2014), winning the first FIA Formula E Drivers' Championship with Nelson Piquet Jr.

History
China Racing was the second team (behind the Drayson Racing project, which then transformed into Trulli GP) to announce its involvement in Formula E, back in March 2013.

2014–15 season

China Racing announced Nelson Piquet Jr. and Ho-Pin Tung as their drivers for the inaugural season. Over the course of the season, the team used multiple drivers in car no. 88, with Tung taking part in three rounds, Antonio García in two rounds, Charles Pic in four rounds, before ultimately picking Oliver Turvey for the final double-header weekend in London. Piquet, on the other hand, completed the full season and managed to win the championship in the final race of the season.

In 2015, the China Racing name and branding had phased out. For the Long Beach ePrix, the team introduced radical changes to their livery, removing the red and yellow which had been previously associated with the team and replacing it with NEXTEV branding. The move was finalised in the following round in Monaco, which the team entered as NEXTEV TCR instead of China Racing.

Despite Piquet winning the championship, NEXTEV TCR only finished fourth in the Teams' Championship, as his teammates only added 8 points, the team scoring 152 points in total.

2015–16 season
NEXTEV TCR chose to develop their own powertrain for the second season and began testing it in the summer of 2015. The team also confirmed Piquet, who was signed on a multi-year deal. Turvey was later confirmed as Piquet's teammate for the season. In 2016, NEXTEV acquired the whole team, which, at the time, was still partially-owned by Team China Racing (hence the 'TCR' part in its name).

The 2015–16 season was a disappointment for the team. Piquet and Turvey only scored 19 points in total, falling down to ninth place in the Teams' Championship, only ahead of Trulli, who withdrew from the championship in its early stages. Turvey scored the team's best season result with a sixth place at the first round in Beijing.

2016–17 season
Piquet and Turvey were retained for the 2016–17 season. The team, previously operated by Campos Racing, was set to form its own operational and engineering team, led by Gerry Hughes. A new branding, NEXTEV Nio, was introduced for the season.

While the team's performance was an improvement over the previous season, it was still unable to compete for either of the Drivers' and Teams' Championships, despite setting pole positions in Hong Kong (with Piquet) and Mexico City (with Turvey). NEXTEV Nio would finish sixth with 59 points.

2017–18 season

Piquet left the team after a performance clause allowed him to exit the team for Jaguar. Luca Filippi was announced as his replacement, while Turvey stayed with the team. Ma Qinghua joined the team as a reserve driver. During the season, he subbed for Filippi in Paris and Turvey in New York, who was forced to withdraw from the double-header after a hand injury. The NextEV brand was slowly phasing out as the team now competed under the name Nio Formula E Team. The NextEV brand stayed in the name of the powertrain.

Nio cemented their position at the back of the grid and only finished eighth in Teams' Championship with 47 points. Turvey, however, managed a podium spot with a second place finish in Mexico City.

2018–19 season
Tom Dillmann and Oliver Turvey were announced as the driver pairing for the 2018–19 season, meaning Turvey would compete for the team for a fourth straight full season. The NextEV brand remained on the car, but the powertrain only featured Nio in its name.

The season would prove to be another disappointment as the team only accumulated 7 points over the course of the season, all of them with Turvey, placing them last (eleventh) in the Teams' Championship.

2019–20 season
The team underwent a change in ownership and is currently managed by Lisheng Sports and Gusto Engineering. On 10 September 2019, the definitive entry list was revealed, in which the team was listed under the name Nio 333 Formula E Team. The team will not be using its own powertrains and it instead acquired last year's powertrain from GEOX Dragon. Nio, however, kept their manufacturer status due to their new powertrain being homologated as such by the FIA in late August. Ma Qinghua also joined the team on a permanent basis, racing alongside the team mainstay Turvey. Qinghua, however, was unable to participate in the 2020 Berlin ePrix due to Chinese travel restrictions, and was replaced by Daniel Abt.

2020–21 season

Tom Blomqvist joined Nio 333 for the 2020–21 season to partner Turvey. In February 2021, Adam Carroll was announced as the reserve driver. The team scored points for the first time since the 2019 New York City ePrix after Turvey secured two points finishes at the Diriyah ePrix double-header. Blomqvist achieved the same feat at the following Rome ePrix double-header.

2021–22 season 
Turvey was retained by the team while Blomqvist departed and was replaced by Carlin Formula 2 driver and former Williams Driver Academy member Dan Ticktum. The team scored their first points of the season in the second race of the Rome ePrix, where Turvey finished 7th and Ticktum finished 10th, which was his first points finish in Formula E.

Results

Notes
  – The team's official name was changed to NEXTEV TCR prior to the 2015 Monaco ePrix.
  – In the inaugural season, all teams were supplied with a spec powertrain by McLaren.
  – The powertrain is a rebadged Penske EV-3 used by GEOX Dragon in the 2018–19 season.
 † – Driver did not finish the race, but was classified as he completed over 90% of the race distance.
 * – Season still in progress.

Footnotes

References

External links

 

Chinese auto racing teams
Auto racing teams established in 2013
Formula E teams
2013 establishments in China
NIO (car company)